The 2022–23 CAA men's basketball season is the 37th season of Colonial Athletic Association basketball, taking place between November 2022 and March 2023.  The season will end with the 2023 CAA men's basketball tournament.

This is the first CAA season after James Madison left to join the Sun Belt Conference, and also the first season for four new CAA members—Hampton, Monmouth, North Carolina A&T, and Stony Brook.

Head coaches

Coaching changes 
Billy Taylor replaced Mike Schrage as Elon head coach.
Willie Jones was fired as North Carolina A&T head coach before the season began. Phillip Shumpert was hired as interim head coach.

Coaches 

Notes:
 All records, appearances, titles, etc. are from time with current school only.
 Year at school includes 2022–23 season.
 Overall and CAA records are from time at current school and are through the end of the 2021–22 season.

Preseason

Preseason poll 
Source

() first place votes

Preseason All-Conference Teams 
Source

Colonial Athletic Association Preseason Player of the Year: Aaron Estrada (Hofstra)

Regular season

Rankings

Conference matrix 
This table summarizes the head-to-head results between teams in conference play.

Postseason

Colonial Athletic Association tournament

NCAA tournament 

The CAA had one bid to the 2023 NCAA Division I men's basketball tournament, that being the automatic bid of Charleston by winning the conference tournament.

National Invitation tournament 

Hofstra received an automatic bid to the 2023 National Invitation Tournament as regular season conference champions.

College Basketball Invitational

The Basketball Classic

Awards and honors

Regular season

CAA Player of the Week

 Nov. 14 – Nicolas Timberlake (Towson)
 Nov. 21 – Aaron Estrada (Hofstra), Ryan Larson (Charleston)
 Nov. 28 – Cam Holden (Towson)
 Dec. 5  – Jyáre Davis (Delaware), Jordan Nesbitt (Hampton)
 Dec. 12 – Jameer Nelson Jr. (Delaware)
 Dec. 19 – Jyáre Davis (Delaware)(2)
 Dec. 26 – Maleeck Harden-Hayes (UNCW)
 Jan. 2  – Amari Williams (Drexel)
 Jan. 9  – Aaron Estrada (Hofstra)(2), Nicolas Timberlake (Towson)(2)
 Jan. 16 – Dalton Bolon (Charleston)
 Jan. 23 – Nicolas Timberlake (Towson)(3)
 Jan. 30 – Aaron Estrada (Hofstra)(3)
 Feb. 6  – Tyler Thomas (Hofstra)
 Feb. 13 – Pat Robinson III (Charleston)
 Feb. 20 – Jameer Nelson Jr. (Delaware)(2)
 Feb. 27 – Jameer Nelson Jr. (Delaware)(3)

CAA Rookie of the Week

 Nov. 14 – Amar’e Marshall (Hofstra)
 Nov. 21 – Amar’e Marshall (Hofstra)(2)
 Nov. 28 – Amar’e Marshall (Hofstra)(3)
 Dec. 5  – Jack Collins (Monmouth)
 Dec. 12 – Amar’e Marshall (Hofstra)(4)
 Dec. 19 – Noah Ross (UNCW)
 Dec. 26 – Max Mackinnon (Elon), Jared Turner (Northeastern)
 Jan. 2  – Duncan Powell (North Carolina A&T)
 Jan. 9  – Duncan Powell (North Carolina A&T)(2)
 Jan. 16 – Charlie Williams (William & Mary)
 Jan. 23 – Justin Moore (Drexel)
 Jan. 30 – Jack Collins (Monmouth)(2)
 Feb. 6  – Max Mackinnon (Elon)(2)
 Feb. 13 – Max Mackinnon (Elon)(3)
 Feb. 20 – Max Mackinnon (Elon)(4)
 Feb. 27 – Kyrese Mullen (Hampton)

Postseason

CAA All-Conference Teams and Awards

Attendance

References